Meshary Al-Arada was a singer and music composer from Kuwait.

Career 
He started singing in childhood and was the first album in which he participated in 1995, then continued to participate in festivals in Kuwait and recording a set of single recordings, to participate in the first album in 1999 entitled The "innovators" with a group of singers, and then continued to participate in various festivals in Kuwait and abroad, such as the United Arab Emirates, Saudi Arabia, United Kingdom, Indonesia and Australia.

Videography 
 2004: "Farshy alturab" فرشي التراب 
 2005: "Ramadan" رمضان 
 2006: "Zeman awal" زمان أول 
 2009: "Tesawar" تصوّر 
 2010: "Ala alehsan" على الإحسان 
 2011: "Khair yajmaona" خير يجمعنا

Death 
On 7 January 2018 he died in a car accident in Saudi Arabia.

See also 
 Mishary Rashid Alafasy

References 

1982 births
2018 deaths
Kuwait University alumni
Kuwaiti writers
Kuwaiti Muslims
Kuwaiti composers
Road incident deaths in Saudi Arabia
Kuwaiti male singers